"Falling in Love Again" is a 1977 song recorded by singer Marvin Gaye and issued on his 1978 album, Here, My Dear album. The song was another track on the personal album that did not discuss the demise of his first marriage. Instead of Anna Gaye, the song talked of the other woman in Marvin's life. Described in "You Can Leave, but It's Going to Cost You" as "that young girl", she was Janis Hunter, whom Gaye had married. In a solemn but still certain tone, he wanted to be sure that this time his love for Janis will be what he had always wanted. But as irony would have it, by the time of the album's release, Marvin and Janis' relationship was failing. By the end of the album's promotion, Janis had split from the singer after nearly two years as a married couple. They eventually divorced in February 1981. This song was the last song on Here, My Dear with a reprise from the album's "theme song", "When Did You Stop Loving Me, When Did I Stop Loving You", playing soon afterwards putting the album to a close for good.

Personnel
All vocals, keyboards and synthesizers by Marvin Gaye
Drums by Bugsy Wilcox
Tenor saxophones by Charles Owens and Fernando Harkness
Bass by Frank Blair
Guitar by Gordon Banks
Percussion by Gary Jones and Elmira Collins

1978 songs
Marvin Gaye songs
Songs written by Marvin Gaye
Song recordings produced by Marvin Gaye